Ceratocapnos is a genus of flowering plants belonging to the family Papaveraceae.

Its native range is Europe, Mediterranean and Western Asia.

Species:
 Ceratocapnos claviculata  (L.) Lidén 
 Ceratocapnos heterocarpa  Durieu 
 Ceratocapnos turbinata  (DC.) Lidén

References

Fumarioideae
Papaveraceae genera